The Caldwell Building, at 1001 Noble St. in Anniston, Alabama, is a historic building built in Italianate style in 1889.  It was listed on the National Register of Historic Places in 1982.

It is a three-story building with red brick and russet colored stone trim.  It is located on Lot 1, Block 1, the hub of the business district of Anniston.

References

External links

National Register of Historic Places in Calhoun County, Alabama
Italianate architecture in Alabama
Buildings and structures completed in 1889
1889 establishments in Alabama